Jordan Scarlett (born July 8, 1995) is a Jamaican professional footballer who currently plays in the USL Championship for Louisville City.

Early life
Scarlett was born in Jamaica, but grew up in The Bronx in New York City.

Career

College and Amateur
From 2010 to 2012, Scarlett starred for Christopher Columbus High School in the Bronx, playing as a central midfielder and scoring 19 goals in 34 appearances from Sophomore year to Senior year. Scarlett also played college soccer at Iona College between 2013 and 2016, and in the USL Premier Development League with Reading United AC in 2015, and Lehigh Valley United in 2016.

Professional
On January 17, 2017, Scarlett was drafted in the third round (61st overall) of the 2017 MLS SuperDraft by New York Red Bulls. He signed with New York Red Bulls II on March 22, 2017. After beginning the 2017 season injured, Scarlett earned a starting position for Red Bull II and made 19 appearances during the season.

In 2018 Scarlett appeared in 20 matches, once again missing significant time due to injury, helping the club reach the USL Playoffs. On February 4, 2019 he signed a new contract with the club.

Scarlett signed with the Tampa Bay Rowdies on December 19, 2019. He was released by Tampa following their 2022 season.

On March 1, 2023, Scarlett signed with USL Championship side Louisville City for their 2023 season.

Career statistics

References

External links
 
newyorkredbulls.com
 
 

1995 births
Living people
Association football defenders
Jamaican footballers
Iona Gaels men's soccer players
Lehigh Valley United players
Louisville City FC players
New York Red Bulls draft picks
New York Red Bulls II players
Tampa Bay Rowdies players
Sportspeople from the Bronx
Soccer players from New York City
USL Championship players
USL League Two players